Eww may refer to:
 Extreme wind warning, an alert issued by the U.S. National Weather Service
 Every Witch Way, a Nickelodeon TV show
 Elinor Wonders Why, a Canadian-American animated kids' show
 eww (web browser), a web browser written entirely in Emacs Lisp included in GNU Emacs
 "Everything Wrong With", an expression commonly used in the YouTube channel CinemaSins
   Expression of disgust